Brian Sockwell (born June 7, 1968) is an American professional stock car racing driver.

Early racing career

Sockwell raced in the Goody's Dash Series for several years, earning several wins. In 1997 he came close to winning the Goody's Dash Series championship, but was edged out by 138 points by Mike Swaim Jr.

Early NASCAR career

2002–2004

In 2002, he came back to the No. 54 Chevy sponsored by Maddux Supply Co. and later Lowdermilk Electric.

In his first season in the Busch Series, he went to the No. 94 Chevy sponsored by RaceApe.com. Later in the season, he moved to the No. 41 Chevy sponsored by cashwell.com.

2005–present

In his only race of the 2005 season, the Sam's Town 250, he went to the No. 88 Reary Racing Chevy.

In 2010, he raced at Charlotte Motor Speedway winning the Legends Millions- Masters division.

Personal life

He has a wife named Janet and a daughter.

Motorsports career results

NASCAR
(key) (Bold - Pole position awarded by qualifying time. Italics - Pole position earned by points standings or practice time. * – Most laps led.)

Nationwide Series

Craftsman Truck Series

References

External links
 

NASCAR drivers
Living people
1968 births
People from Browns Summit, North Carolina
Racing drivers from North Carolina